Simona Ventura (born 1 April 1965) is an Italian television presenter.

Television career
Ventura was born in Bentivoglio. She started in TV on "Domani Sposi" with Giancarlo Magalli on Rai Uno.
Her love for sport took her into sports reporting: for the Italian Telemontecarlo she was the correspondent during the 1990 FIFA World Cup, UEFA Euro 1992 and the 1992 Summer Olympics.

At RAI, Ventura appeared with Pippo Baudo on the Sunday afternoon programme "Domenica In" (1991) and then, in 1992, the sports programme "Domenica Sportiva".
She has also been on "Pavarotti International".

Ventura's career continued on Mediaset channels hosting variety shows like "Mai dire gol", "Cuori e Denari, "Boom", "Scherzi a parte" (a programme very similar to Punk'd), "Festivalbar", "Le Iene", "Matricole",  Gli indelebili '99, "Cari amici miei", "Zelig - Noi facciamo cabaret", and "Piccole Canaglie". In all, she spent eight years at Mediaset.

In 1996 Simona hosted the newcomers' section of the Sanremo Music Festival for  RAI.

In 2001 Simona went back to Rai Due to host the seventh edition of the Sunday afternoon show "Quelli che il calcio" and a prime time show called "Quelli che lo smoking". In 2002 Pippo Baudo chose her for the "Dopofestival" (a variety show about the Sanremo Music Festival) and she then presented a late night television show with Gene Gnocchi called "La grande notte del lunedì sera". She has been presenting the Italian version of Celebrity Survivor, L'Isola Dei Famosi since 2003.
In 2004 she was host presenter of San Remo Music Festival.
In 2005 and 2006 she presented Music farm, a show similar to the Hit Me, Baby, One More Time format, on Rai Due.

She also had the Prime Time Access Rule on Rai Uno with "Le Tre Scimmiette" and in 2007 appeared in prime time with "Colpo di Genio".

She presented "Quelli che il Calcio" until 2011.

Simona Ventura led the popular reality show L'isola dei famosi for 8 editions. In the fall of 2009, she abandoned her role as a judge on X-Factor. Working on his two most important programmes, Simona Ventura in May 2011 had some problems with the company. The director of RAI 2 Massimo Liofredi tried not to renew the contract of Simona Ventura for this reason after she signed a contract with Sky.

Simona was a judge in seasons 1, 2, 5, 6 and 7 of the Italian X-Factor, winning the fifth one with her act Francesca Michielin.

Simona Ventura signed a contract for two years with satellite platform Sky after almost 10 years spent working at RAI bringing good advertising revenue, becoming the queen of RAI 2, leaving the company to move to the satellite network.

In early 2016 Simona Ventura returned to Mediaset as a contestant of the XI season of the popular reality show L'isola dei famosi now hosted by Alessia Marcuzzi with Alvin on Canale 5 and won by Giacobbe Fragomeni.

In the autumn of 2016 Mariano Di Vaio (in couple with the dancer Stefano De Martino) is one of the tutors/mentors of the first season of Selfie – Le cose cambiano, the new talent show produced by Fascino PGT of Maria De Filippi and aired by Canale 5 with Simona Ventura as presenter. Bernardo Corradi (in couple with the dancer Stefano De Martino) in May-June 2017 is one of the tutors/mentors in the second season of Selfie – Le cose cambiano, a talent show produced by Fascino PGT of Maria De Filippi and aired by Canale 5 with Simona Ventura as presenter.

Other appearances
In 1996 Ventura was the Italian voice of Lola Bunny in Space Jam.

She acted in the film Fratelli Coltelli in 1997.

In 2008 Ventura starred in La fidanzata di papà with Massimo Boldi and Elisabetta Canalis.

In 2009 Ventura was trolled by English rock band Muse in her show "Quelli che.. il Calcio".

In 2010 she had a cameo in Sofia Coppola's Somewhere.

In 2012, Ventura provided the voice of the pre-match presenter in the EA Sports video game FIFA 13.

Awards 
Ventura has won 4 Telegatti as Best Female Figure of the Year.

Programs 
 Domani sposi (Rai 1, 1988)
 Domenica In (Rai 1, 1991–1992)
 Pavarotti International (Rai 1, 1991)
 Domenica Sportiva (Rai 1, 1992)
 Mai dire gol (Italia 1, 1994–1997)
 Cuori e denari (Canale 5, 1995)
 Scherzi a parte (Italia 1,1995; Canale 5,1999)
 Boom (Canale 5, 1998)
 Festivalbar 1997 (Italia 1, 1997)
 Gli indelebili '99 (Italia 1, 1999)
 Matricole (Italia 1, 1997–2000)
 Le Iene (Italia 1, 1997–2001)
 Comici (Italia 1, 2000)
 Cari amici miei (Italia 1, 2000)
 Zelig - Facciamo cabaret (Italia 1, 2000–2001)
 Piccole Canaglie (Italia 1, 2001)
 Quelli che... il calcio (Rai 2, 2001–2011)
 Dopofestival (Rai 1, 2002)
 La grande notte del lunedì sera (Rai 2, 2002)
 L'isola dei famosi (Rai 2, 2003–2011)
 Festival di Sanremo (Rai 1, 2004)
 MTV Europe Music Awards (MTV, 2004)
 Le tre scimmiette (Rai 1, 2005)
 Music Farm (Rai 2, 2005–2006)
 Children's Party at the Palace (BBC One, 2006)
 Colpo di genio (Rai 1, 2007)
 X Factor (Rai 2, 2008–2009; Sky Uno, 2011–2013)
 Simona Goes to Hollywood (Sky Uno, 2012)
 Oscar Fashion Night (Sky Uno, 2012)
 Simona goes to Hollywood – The day after (Sky Uno, 2012)
 MTV Europe Music Awards (MTV, 2015)

Personal life
Ventura was married to Italian footballer and television personality Stefano Bettarini between 1998 and 2004; they have two children together.

References

External links 

 Official Site

1965 births
Italian television presenters
Italian women television presenters
Living people
Miss Universe 1988 contestants
People from the Province of Bologna